Tweedledum and Tweedledee are a duo of supervillains appearing in comic books published by DC Comics, primarily as enemies of Batman.

Dumfree and Deever Tweed made his live-action debut in the third season of Gotham, portrayed by Adam Petchel and Happy Anderson.

Publication history
Tweedledum and Tweedledee first appeared in Detective Comics #74 (April 1943), and were created by Bob Kane, Jerry Robinson and Don Cameron.

Fictional character biographies
Dumfree Tweed and Deever Tweed are cousins who resemble each other so closely that they are often mistaken for identical twins. The pair are known as Tweedledum and Tweedledee, both as a play on words on their real names, and because they closely resemble Sir John Tenniel's depictions of the characters in Lewis Carroll's Through the Looking-Glass. The two Tweeds always conduct their criminal activity in partnership with one another. They prefer to mastermind criminal schemes and let their henchmen carry out any necessary physical activity. The Tweeds will often use their extraordinary resemblance to trick their opponents into thinking there is only one of them. Tweedledum and Tweedledee first encountered Batman and Robin when they began a crime spree in Gotham City. Batman and Robin have fought against the Tweeds and have overcome them on subsequent occasions.

The pair makes an appearance in Arkham Asylum: A Serious House on Serious Earth as inmates in Arkham Asylum. In this incarnation, they appear attached to each other by a pair of electroshock helmets, with Tweedledum representing the right half of the brain, and Tweedledee the left.

Although Tweedledum and Tweedledee are most often depicted as being the leaders of their own criminal organization, they sometimes are reimagined as the henchmen of the Joker.

In a shoot-out with the GCPD during War Games, Dum is shot in the head.

During the Infinite Crisis, Tweedledum and Tweedledee appear as members of Alexander Luthor, Jr.'s Secret Society of Super Villains. Joker refers to them as "Tweedledee and the new Dum" implying that the original Tweedledum is either dead or still incarcerated. It was later confirmed in Detective Comics #841 that Dumfree Tweed had died and his twin brother Dumson Tweed had taken his place.

The new Tweedledum and Tweedledee were part of the Wonderland Gang. Originally believed by the public to be run by the Mad Hatter, it was revealed that the Tweeds really ran the gang using one of Tetch's own mind control devices on him to cash in on his notoriety. They filled the Wonderland Gang with other pairs based on Alice in Wonderland (such as Mad Harriet, the Lion and the Unicorn, and the Walrus and the Carpenter). After Batman took down the henchmen, Mad Hatter eventually got back at them by sticking mind control chips on the two and turning them on each other. The villains were eventually arrested by the police. After some imprisonment, the Tweeds reformed the Wonderland Gang with the Walrus and the Carpenter, but were quickly apprehended by Batman, Robin and Nightwing.

During the Salvation Run storyline, Tweedledum and Tweedledee ended up deported to another planet where the other villains rounded up were sent to.

Tweedledum and Tweedledee were seen being released by Hush, who was masquerading as Bruce Wayne.

The New 52
In The New 52 (a reboot DC's continuity launched in September 2011), they are reintroduced as the Tweed Brothers, working with Mad Hatter. They have been manipulated by Mad Hatter in a plot to make Gotham City insane. They are soon taken out by Batman. They also seem to have superhuman strength and resistance.

During the Forever Evil storyline, Tweedledum and Tweedledee are among the villains recruited by the Crime Syndicate of America to join the Secret Society of Super Villains.

Powers and abilities
Tweedledum and Tweedledee officially have no superpowers, but their fat bodies enable them to bounce and roll as they please. In The New 52, the brothers have superhuman strength and resistance.

Other versions

Batman: Arkham
In the Batman: Arkham Knight prequel comic series, both Tweedledee and Tweedledum are hired by Penguin to steal a shipment from Waynetech. They are also given a henchman they dub "Tweedledie". Though successful in capturing the cargo, Batman catches up and defeats the cousins, leaving them behind for the GCPD. Tweedledum and Tweedledee are later killed by the Arkham Knight in their cell with a shotgun.

Injustice: Gods Among Us
In the Injustice: Gods Among Us prequel comic series, Tweedledee and Tweedledum appear in Year Five, meeting with Black Mask, Man-Bat, Bronze Tiger, Scarecrow, and Mad Hatter until Robin arrives and fights the villains. Robin easily manages to defeat Tweedledee and Tweedledum, but is soon overwhelmed by all of the villains and knocked unconscious until he's saved by Deadman who possesses Bronze Tiger and calls for help.

In other media

Television
 Tweedledum and Tweedledee appear in The Batman/Superman Hour episode "A Mad Mad Tea Party", both voiced by Ted Knight. This version of the duo work for the Mad Hatter.
 Tweedledum and Tweedledee appear in Batman: The Brave and the Bold. This version of the duo utilize a coordinated fighting style, possess increased bouncing capabilities, and work for Baby Face.
 Dumfree and Deever Tweed appear in the third season of Gotham, portrayed by Adam Petchel and Happy Anderson respectively. This version of the duo are professional wrestlers, boxers, and members of the "Terrible Tweeds" alongside three unnamed brothers. Introduced in the episode "Mad City: New Day Rising", Jervis Tetch brainwashes the Tweeds to serve as his enforcers and help him attack the Gotham City Police Department (GCPD) to rescue his sister Alice. Tetch, Alice, Dumfree, and Deever successfully escape, but two of the Tweeds are killed while one is arrested. Throughout the episodes "Follow the White Rabbit" and "Red Queen", the remaining Tweeds continue to serve Tetch until the GCPD eventually arrest the trio and incarcerate them at Arkham Asylum.

Video games
 A biography for Tweedledum and Tweedledee appears in Batman: Arkham Asylum.
 Tweedledum and Tweedledee appear in Batman: The Enemy Within, voiced by Kirk Thornton and Dave B. Mitchell respectively. This version of the duo are named Frank Dumfree and Willy Deever respectively and patrons of the Stacked Deck Bar who have had previous interactions with Batman and later find work with the Joker.

See also
 List of Batman Family enemies

References

External links
 Tweedledum and Tweedledee Bio

DC Comics characters with superhuman strength
Comics characters introduced in 1943
DC Comics supervillains
Twin characters in comics
Comic strip duos
Fictional henchmen
Golden Age supervillains
Characters created by Bob Kane
Characters created by Jerry Robinson
DC Comics male supervillains